St. James' Episcopal Church and Parish House is a historic Episcopal church at 2500 Jerome Avenue and 190th Street, in the Fordham neighborhood of The Bronx in New York City. It was founded July 5, 1853, becoming the first Episcopal parish in Fordham. The parish at first met at the Manor Reformed Church on Kingsbridge Road, then on June 11, 1854 acquired an old schoolhouse for use. On October 1, 1854, the Rev. Joshua Weaver became its first rector.

Buildings

The church was designed in 1863 by architect Henry C. Dudley (1813-1894). Bishop Horatio Potter laid the cornerstone of the present building on May 28, 1864, and the church was consecrated by the same on All Saints' Day, November 1, 1865.

It is a "native stone" building with brownstone trim in the Gothic Revival style. It was completed at a cost of $25,000.

The stone parish house, located on Jerome Avenue, was built 1891-1892 to the designs by Henry Franklin Kilburn. It was listed on the National Register of Historic Places in 1982. It was designated a New York City Landmark in 1980.

The parish also operated an apartment building on its property, built to relieve the housing shortage after World War I and as a business venture to raise revenue for expanding the church and parish house. It opened in 1924; however, the debt proved onerous with the coming of the Great Depression. The property was finally sold in 1924.

See also
List of New York City Designated Landmarks in the Bronx
National Register of Historic Places listings in the Bronx

References

External links
St. James' Episcopal Church website

19th-century Episcopal church buildings
Churches completed in 1863
Episcopal church buildings in the Bronx
Fordham, Bronx
Gothic Revival church buildings in New York City
New York City Designated Landmarks in the Bronx
Properties of religious function on the National Register of Historic Places in the Bronx